The Carlton Theatre was a London West End dual-purpose theatre-cum-cinema built in 1927 for Adolph Zukor's Paramount Pictures.  It continues in use as a cinema and is now called Empire Haymarket.

It was  designed by Frank Verity and Sam Beverley in Italian and Spanish Renaissance architectural style with a total seating capacity is 1,150 and a dual theatre or cinema capability.

It opened on 27 April 1927 with the successful musical play  Lady Luck by Firth Shephard and starring Laddie Cliff. In 1933 it staged another stage success, a run of   Bitter Sweet by Noël Coward.

The Carlton Theatre was wired for sound in 1929 and increasingly went over to being used as a  full-time cinema.

It was  originally built and owned by Paramount Pictures and was operated by them until 1954 when it was leased to Twentieth Century Fox as their West End showcase for CinemaScope films.

Fox continued to operate the Carlton until 1977 when they withdrew from cinema operations in London (they had also run the Rialto, Coventry Street). The cinema was taken over by Classic and the former stage area was sold for demolition and redevelopment. The auditorium was divided into three screens  and reopened on 11 January 1979 as the Classic Haymarket. Various changes in ownership resulted in name changes to Cannon, MGM, Virgin, UGC and Cineworld Haymarket.

The Cinema is currently operated by Empire cinemas who took over ownership in 2017.

It was listed Grade II on the National Heritage List for England in October 2018.

References

Event venues established in 1927
Theatres completed in 1927
Theatres in the City of Westminster
Cinemas in London
Grade II listed theatres
Grade II listed buildings in the City of Westminster